Amalia Sánchez Ariño (1883–1969) was a Spanish-born Argentine stage and film actress. She appeared in more than fifty films during her career.

Selected filmography
 The Wicked Carabel (1935)
 Blood Wedding (1938)
 The Three Rats (1946)
 Story of a Bad Woman (1948)
 The Goddess of Rio Beni (1950)
 The Honourable Tenant (1951) 
 Honour Your Mother (1951)
 Return to the Truth (1956)
 Juan Simón's Daughter (1957)
 Listen To My Song (1959)
 Alfonso XII and María Cristina (1960)

References

Bibliography 
 Richard, Alfred. Censorship and Hollywood's Hispanic image: an interpretive filmography, 1936-1955. Greenwood Press, 1993.

External links 
 

1883 births
1969 deaths
Argentine film actresses
Spanish film actresses
Spanish emigrants to Argentina